Medical Dental Building may refer to:

Medical Dental Building (Dallas, Texas), listed on the National Register of Historic Places (NRHP)
Medical Dental Building (Portland, Oregon)
Medical Dental Building (Seattle, Washington), NRHP-listed